Ellenki College of Engineering and Technology, known as ECET was founded in the year 1999 and is located in Hyderabad, Telangana. The college is affiliated to Jawaharlal Nehru Technological University, Hyderabad. The campus is located in the Hyderabad city suburbs near BHEL, Patancheru area.

See also
List of engineering colleges in Telangana
Education in India
Literacy in India
List of institutions of higher education in Telangana

References

Medak district
Engineering colleges in Telangana
1999 establishments in Andhra Pradesh
Educational institutions established in 1999